Urban Knights V is the sixth album of the jazz group Urban Knights released in 2003 on Narada Records. The album rose to No. 15 on the Billboard Jazz Albums chart.

Overview
Urban Knights V was executively produced by Ramsey Lewis. Artists such as Kenny Garrett and Michelle Williams appeared on the album.

Tracklisting

References

2003 albums
Urban Knights albums